Slobodanka Stupar, (Sarajevo, 1947), is Serbian visual artist who lives and works in Belgrade, Athens and Cologne.

Biography
Slobodanka Stupar graduated from Applied Arts School in Belgrade (B.F.A.)

She graduated School of Fine Arts at University of Belgrade (M.F.A.)

She specialized at the School of Fine Arts in Athens.

The work
The separation of elementary metaphors and other figurative mechanisms, i.e. deconstruction, has become an effective tool for understanding and interpreting recent visual art. This is
especially true where the artist has moved from a more "classical" form of expression, arising from an academic training, to a practice involving a visualized language and semantic composition mode of expression, of which Slobodanka Stupar is an example. This transition was all the more likely in her case given the freedom which she already had in using the graphic art medium, closer to experimentation than the reproduction of any standard approach. Even from the outset of her artistic career she had been leaning towards a reexamination of the expressive capabilities of visual art. Combining the incompatible, to maintain any discourse (in this case visual) one has to remove or circumvent ordinary comprehensibility, or "sense"; to make something "apparent" the plastic narrative had to be reduced to the brink of unrecognizability in order to be "seen" as a new work. This is precisely the kind of work Stupar has been producing over the last few years. The works at this exhibition are among those which have emerged from this new understanding of the function of art works as self-sufficient structures of meaning, autonomously establishing the scope of their own significance.

Grants and residencies
 1980–1981 Young Artists grant, Belgrade
 1983 "Mosa Pijade" grant for residence in London
 1985 Scholarship from Ministry of Education of Greece, Athens
 1991 The Grant of Fondation pour une Entraide Intellectuelle Europeene, Paris
 1996 Stiftung Kulturfonds, Haus Lukas, Ahrenshoop, (Germany)

Awards and recognitions
 1987 October Salon Price for Graphic Art, Belgrade
 1987 Price for Sculpture from Art Colony Sisak, Sisak, (Croatia)
 1989 Purchase Price from the National University Library at XII Zagreb, Exhibition of Contemporary Yugoslav Drawing, Zagreb
 1990 Grand Prix at the IX Frechen International Graphic Triennial, Germany
 1993 2nd Prize at Biennial of Dry Point, Užice, (Yugoslavia)
 1997 Purchase Price from National Museum at Belgrade International Biennial of Graphic Art, Belgrade
 1999 Price at Fotowettbewerb Award 1999. Digitale Fotografie, Stuttgart

Selected solo exhibitions

 1979 Gallery Grafički Kolektiv, Belgrade
 1980 Sebastian Gallery, Dubrovnik
 1984 Richard Demarco Gallery, Edinburgh
 1987 Kreonidis Gallery, Athens
 1988 Art Gallery Christos Kyriazis, Athens
 1990 Cultural Centre Gallery, Belgrade
 1992 Ligue Franco-Hellenique Gallery, Athens
 1992 Rozmarin Gallery, Munich, Olching
 1995 Rathaus Köln, Cologne
 1995 Simultanhalle, Cologne
 1996 BAP, Witten, (Germany)
 1996 BBK Gallery, Cologne
 1997 Kaos Gallery, Cologne
 1997 Zlatno Oko Gallery, Novi Sad (Yugoslavia)
 1998 Zepter Gallery, Belgrade
 1999 Christuskirche Cologne, Cologne

 2001 Artforum Gallery, Thessaloniki
 2002 Cultural Centre Gallery, Belgrade
 2003 Diana Gallery, Athens
 2006 Artforum Gallery, Thessaloniki
 2008 Zlatno Oko Gallery, Novi Sad (Yugoslavia)
 2008 Moderna Gallery, Lazarevac, Belgrade
 2009 Red Gallery, Athens
 2011 Gallery "Beograd", Belgrade
 2012 Gallery ULUS, Belgrade

Other works and projects
 1984 Symphony, performances at Festival Second New Music, Student Culturale Centre, Belgrade
 1986 Secret life, Town Festival, Belgrade
 1987 Area of Touch / Space of Contact, lecturing at Open School Djurdjevo, (Yugoslavia)
 1992 Ceci n’est pas une pipe (communication project - live talk with the viewers, improvisational narration and excerpts from Miroslav Mandić’s book "Blue Rose"), collaboration with composer Lj. Jovanovic, Quantenpool Köln part of Kassel Documenta IX 's Piazza Virtuale TV project; live transmission on TV, Kassel and 3sat from Moltkerei Werkstatt, Cologne
 1995 Mirror, performance in collaboration with LJ. Jovanovic, Simultanhalle, Cologne
 1996 Ueber den Tiellerrand hinaus, performance with Inge Broska and Hans-Joerg, Tauschert at Tangenten Festival, Köln
 1996 Answer to my Lette, open art project upon art communication
 1999 WHAT IF…?, performance, Galičnik (Macedonia)

Works in museums and public collections
Museum of Contemporary Art, Belgrade * Ludwig Museum, Cologne * National Museum, Belgrade * Museum of City of Belgrade Belgrade, * Museum Zepter, Belgrade *
National Museum, Kraljevo * National Museum, Vranje * National Gallery of Piraeus,
Greece * American College of Greece, Athens * Gallery of Contemporary Art,
Zrenjanin * Art Collection of the National University Library, Zagreb * Art Collection
"Lazar Vozarevis" Sremska Mitrovica * Collection of Graphic Art, Frechen *
Museum of International Contemporary Graphic Art, Fredrikstad * Collection
Grafički Kolektiv, Belgrade * Art Collections of Art Colonies Sisak, Poreč, Tuzla and Sopoćani

Bibliography (selected)
 1979 Petar Gudelj, "Ako mi je malo svjetlosti (Napisano pred grafikama Slobodanke Marinovic Stupar)”, pref. solo exhib. Graficki kolektiv, Belgrade
 1979 Dusan Djokic, Umetnost 65
 1980 Sonja Seferovic, "Emotivne akvatinte Slobodanke Stupar", Dubrovacki vjesnik br. 1547, 6 June, Dubrovnik
 1982 Dusan Djokic, pref. solo exhib, Studio Gallery Forum, Zagreb
 1982 Josip Depolo, "Slobodanka Stupar (Studio Gallery Forum"), "Oko" No. 22, Zagreb
 1982 Dusan Djokic, "Slobodanka Stupar i Vesna Zlamalik: Graficki izraz i osecanje prirode", pref. National Museum, Novi Pazar
 1984 "11 grafickih listova", pref. Gallery Sebastian, Varaždin
 1985 Kosta Bogdanovic, pref. solo exhib. Gallery KNU, Belgrade
 1985 Dusan Djokic, "Telo kao motiv, grafike i sculpture Slobodanke Stupar u galeriji KNU u Beogradu", Borba, 10 October, Belgrade
 1986 Dusan Djokic, pref. solo exhib, Gallery Dom kulture, Smederevo
 1986–1987 Zana Gvozdenovic, "Grafike Slobodanke Stupar, pref. solo exhib., Gallery of the Yugoslav Ciltural Centre, Vienna, Gallery "Kreonidis", Athens
 1987 "Stupar im Jugoslawischen Kulturzentrum", Diplomatic Correspondence 1/87
 1987 Nikos Aleksiou, "Slobodanka Stupar", Rizospastis, 11 April
 1987 "Najbolja djela – Salamun, Stupar", Vjesnik Zeljezare Sisak, 12 June, Sisak
 1988 Aleksandar Djuric, "Budjenje Antropometrije iz nesvesti" pref. solo exhib., Gallery of Cultural Centre, Vranje
 1988 Zana Gvozdenovic, "Prevlast pokreta", solo exhib. Gallery Cristos Kiriazis, Faliro, Athens
 1990 Irina Subotic, "Ruke i krstovi", pref. solo exhib., Gallery Kulturni Centar, Belgrade
 1990 Ljiljana Cinkul, "U galeriji KCB otvorena je izlozba slika i crteza Slobodanke Stupar", 3. program Radio Belgrade, 5 February, Belgrade
 1990 D. Devic, "Belezenje dodira", Narodne novine, 14 March
 1990 Jasmina Tuturov, "Unutrasnji kosmos, uz izlozbu Slobodanke Stupar u savremenoj Galeriji u Zrenjaninu", Zrenjanin
 1992 "Ölgemälde von Stupar", Fürstenfeldbrucker Tagblatt, 12 March
 1992 "Spurensuche in der Natur, Die Galerie Rozmarin zeigt Werke der Künstlerin Slobodanka Stupar", Münchener Merkur, April
 1992 "Der Reiz liegt im unmittelbaren Ausdruck Kuenstlerischen Wollens", Fürstenfeldbrucker Tagblatt, November
 1992 Jürgen Raap, "Quantenpool in der Moltkerei-Werkstatt" Kölner Illustrierte, September
 1993 Bernd v. den Brinken, Nachtsendung (3.15-3.45) ”C’est ci n’est pas une pipe" – Slobodanka Stupar, Ljiljana Jovanovic", Quantenpool Köln, Vilter Verlag
 1995 Dr. Bettina Mette, "Nine Doors to Nowhere" und "Vertical/The Passage", pref. solo exhib. Simultanhalle, Cologne
 1995 Bruno Schneider, "Türen, die ins Nichts führen, Slobodanka Stupar zeigt in der Simultanhalle eine Installation aus Reispapier, Spiegelstreifen und Stahlwolle", Kölnische Rundschau/Kölner Kultur, 9 June
 1995 Jürgen Schön, "Lichtspiele", Kölner Stadt-Anzeiger Nr. 140, 20 June
 1995 "Werke ausländischer Kuenstler im Foyer des historischen Rathauses", Kölnische Rundschau, 14 September
 1995 M. Zivojinov, "Ogledalo slike i muzike", Evropske Novosti, 21 September
 1995 Ursula Franck, "Slobodanka Stupar (Simultanhalle Cologne, 28 May  – June 1995) Arti October
 1996 Jünger Küsters "Von Kunst und Alltag", Kölner Stadt-Anzeiger 16/17 March
 1996 "Bilder voller Energie", Ruhr Nachtrichten, 17 October
 1998 Jürgen Schön "Geheimnis der Schrift" Ausstellung Stupar, Kölner Stadt-Anzeiger Nr. 13, 16 January
 1998 Gordana Stanisic, pref. cat. solo exhib., Gallery Zepter, Belgrade
 1998 "Stepenice do neba", Novosti, 24 January
 1998 Mirjana Radojcic "Nedodirljivi prostori", izlozba Slobodanke Stupar u galeriji Zepter, Politika 6 February, Belgrade
 1998 Jovan Despotović, "Vrata i drugi zapisi Slobodanke Stupar" 3. Program Radio Belgrade, February, Belgrade
 1998 Jovan Despotović, Slobodanka Stupar, Arti, vol. 39, May–July, p.p. 204-207, Athens
 2000 Bia Papadopoulos, "Commentary on the Twentieth Century" pref. group exhib., Artforum Gallery, Thessaloniki
 2002 Bia Papadopoulos, Slobodanka Stupar, "Mistirio ton Grammaton", pref. solo exhib., Artforum Gallery, Thessaloniki
 2002 Sava Ristovic, pref. solo exhib., Gallery KC, Belgrade
 2002 Lena Kokkini, pref. group exhib. "Terra Incognita" Diana Gallery, Athens
 2003 Lena Kokkini, pref. solo exhib. Diana Gallery, Athens
 2003 Bia Papadopoulos, "Witness" pref. cat. solo exhib., Diana Gallery, Athens
 2003 Milena Marjanovic, "Saputanja iz jastuka", Blic, 8 October, Belgrade
 2004 Bia Papadopoulos "In The Beginning Was Fire", pref. group exhib., Titanium Gallery, Athens
 2007 Bia Papadopoulos, "Chronicle of the Absurd", pref. cat. group exhib., Museum of Photography, Thessaloniki
 2008 Sava Ristovic, pref. for solo exhibition, Zlatno Oko, Novi Sad, Modern Gallery Lazarevac
 2009 Bia Papadopoulos, Voyage of meditation and self- knowledge, pref. for solo exhibition, Red Gallery, Athens
 2011 Jovan Despotović, Slobodanka Stupar, 3. program Radio Beograda, 25 February, Belgrade
 2011 Jovan Despotović, Above and Below, pref., Subjectilе is Subjectilе, Gallery "Beograd", Belgrade

References

Sources 
 Documentation of the Museum of Contemporary Art, Belgrade
 2011 Subjectil is Subjectil, (monograph), Gallery "Beograd", Belgrade

External links
 Slobodanka Stupa, videos
 Slobodanka Stupar, works
 http://issuu.com/slobodankastupar/docs/slobodanka_stupar__from_object_to_c_0a07ad2d69188b?workerAddress=ec2-23-20-236-112.compute-1.amazonaws.com

1947 births
Living people
Serbian contemporary artists
Artists from Sarajevo
Artists from Belgrade
Artists from Athens
Artists from Cologne